Idsall School is a coeducational secondary school with academy status located in the town of Shifnal in Shropshire, England. Idsall has its own Sixth Form Centre, which offers a range of A Level subjects.

The House Cup
When joining the school, pupils are assigned a house (usually, two tutor groups belong to each house) during their first week. The houses are named after four Shropshire hills (Caradoc, Longmynd, Ragleth and Wrekin). They take part in sports (and others, including scrabble) competitions throughout the year. Every year at the end of summer term, there is a whole school assembly. At this assembly the house that has collected the most points throughout the year is the winner and is awarded the Finney Shield.

Field trips
The school holds annual residential trips to Plas Caerdeon (in Wales) for year 7, respectively, and skiing trips in Austria/France for years 8,9,10,11 12 and 13. Also once pupils have taken their options in year 10, they will have the opportunity to go on non -residential field trips subject to their options (Trips to a Church for RE, Museums for Art, etc.). They will also have the opportunity to go on residential trips subject to the options they took, for example Art trips to either New York, Florence, Barcelona and Paris happen every year and a Geography trip to Iceland goes ahead every two years. During year 8, pupils take part in the year 8 challenge, which acts as a foundation to the Duke of Edinburgh's bronze award, and includes a walk up the 'House Hill' amongst other things such as activities that will help their local community.

The Sixth Form
Idsall Sixth Form has about 200 students, separated roughly in half into years 12 and 13. Sixth Form lessons are taught primarily in the Sixth Form Centre, an annex of the school which also houses the common room, although some lessons are taught in the main school, due to timetabling conflicts or special subject requirements (for example, Biology, Chemistry and Physics are usually taught in one of the schools science labs, and Drama in the school hall).

Notable former pupils

Due to its proximity to the FA's former youth academy at Lilleshall, many professional footballers, including several England international, attended the school during their time at Lilleshall.

The school also has a prolific music department.

Nicky Barmby (footballer)
Shaun Bailey (politician- Member of Parliament for West Bromwich West)
Wes Brown (footballer)
Sol Campbell (footballer)
Jamie Carragher (footballer)
Andy Cole (footballer)
Joe Cole (footballer)
Jermain Defoe (footballer)
Rob Edwards (footballer)
Jon Harley (footballer)
Steve Haslam (footballer)
Andy Johnson (cricketer)
Michael Owen (footballer)
Scott Parker (footballer)
Nick Pickering (footballer)
Adam Shimmons (cricketer)
Ben Thatcher (footballer)
Alison Williamson (Archer - Olympic Bronze medalist)

References

External links
 Idsall school

Secondary schools in Shropshire
Academies in Shropshire
Shifnal